Provincial elections were held in British India in January 1946 to elect members of the legislative councils of British Indian provinces. The consummation of British rule in India were the 1945/1946 elections. As minor political parties were eliminated, the political scene became restricted to the Indian National Congress and the  Muslim League who were more antagonised than ever. The Congress, in a repeat of the 1937 elections, won 90 percent of the general non-Muslim seats while the Muslim League won the majority of Muslim seats (87%) in the provinces. Nevertheless, the All India Muslim League verified its claim to be the sole representative of Muslim India. The election laid the path to Pakistan.

Background
On 19 September 1945, following negotiations between Indian leaders and members of the 1946 Cabinet Mission to India from the United Kingdom, the Viceroy Lord Wavell announced that elections to the provincial and central legislatures would be held in December 1945 to January 1946. It was also announced that an executive council would be formed and a constitution-making body would be convened after these elections. These elections were important as the provincial assemblies thus formed were to then elect a new Constituent Assembly which would begin formulating a constitution for an independent India. All contesting parties began campaigning. The Congress contended that it represented the entire Indian population while the Muslim League professed to speak for the whole Muslim population. The dominant issue of the election campaign became the issue of Pakistan.

Originally, the Muslim League had been a party which received most of its support from the Muslim-minority provinces, where fear of Hindu ‘domination’ was greater as was the sense of ‘a loss of privilege’, and to showcase its argument for Muslim nationhood the League needed support from both Muslim-majority as well as Muslim-minority provinces. In the election campaign, the League resorted to establishing networks with traditional power bases, such as landowners and the religious elite, in the Muslim-majority provinces to win support. Religious slogans were utilized and the term ‘Pakistan’ was put forward. Some scholars state that the meaning of Pakistan was kept vague so that it meant different things to different people. On the other hand, Venkat Dhulipala observes that, rather than being vague, the proposals for Pakistan were vigorously debated in public, maps printed, economic foundations analysed and Pakistan was envisioned as a modern Islamic state.

In contrast to earlier elections, the religious commitment was intertwined with a declaration of Muslim communal unity. Casting the vote became an Islamic act. Consequently, for the Muslim electorate, Pakistan represented both a nation-state for India's Muslims, but one which surpassed the common state structure, and an awakening of an Islamic polity where Islam would be blended with the state's functioning.

Unlike previous elections under British rule where voting was restricted by property and educational qualifications,the elections of 1946 saw the voting franchise extended to a quarter of Indian adult population.

Results
The results were not in favour of the Muslim league. Of the total of 1585 seats, Congress won 923 (58.23%)  and the All-India Muslim League won 425 seats (26.81% of the total), placing it as the second-ranking party. It captured all Muslim constituencies in the central assembly as well as most of the Muslim constituencies in the provincial legislatures. The vote opened the path to Pakistan. The system of separate electorates ensured that Muslim contestants would compete with other Muslim candidates instead of facing non-Muslim contestants. Thus, the establishment of Pakistan was debated mainly among Muslims themselves.

The Muslim League's biggest success was in Bengal where out of 119 seats for Muslims, it won 113. The League reinforced its vote in the Muslim minority provinces. It won 54 out of 64 Muslim seats in the United Provinces and 34 of Bihar's 40 Muslim seats. It captured all Muslim seats in Bombay and Madras. The party demonstrated that it was the representative of Muslim India.

The Communist Party of India had presented 108 candidates, out of whom only 8 won a seat. The set-back came as a result of the decision of the party not to support the Quit India movement of 1942. Seven out of the eight seats it won were reserved for labour representatives. All in all, the Communist Party obtained 2.5% of the popular vote. Albeit far from competing with the two main parties, the communists became the third force in terms of the popular vote. Amongst the communist candidates elected were Jyoti Basu (railways constituency in Bengal), Ratanlal Brahman (Darjeeling) and Rupnarayan Ray (Dinajpur).

The results for the North-West Frontier Province came through in March. Congress achieved a strong majority, largely due to the personality of Abdul Ghaffar Khan, enabling them to form a government without trouble.

In Punjab, the concerted effort of the Muslim League led to its greatest success, winning 75 seats of the total Muslim seats and becoming the largest single party in the Assembly. The Unionist Party suffered heavy losses winning only 20 seats in total. The Congress was the second-largest party, winning 43 seats, whilst the Sikh centric Akali Dal came third with 22 seats.

In Assam, Congress won all of the general seats and most of those were reserved for special interest, thus forming the local government. The Muslim League won all of the Muslim seats.

In the Muslim majority province of Sind, the Muslim League won the most seats. Congress however also achieved strong results, and initially hoped to form a coalition in government with four Muslims who had defected from the Muslim League. At the last minute, one of the four Muslim dissidents went over to the Muslim League, handing them a majority of one. Congress then lobbied three European members, who would swing the balance of power into their favour, but their overtures were rejected. The Governor of Sind, therefore, asked the Muslim League to form the local government.

Legislative Assemblies

Overall Muslim League Performance 
In the 1946 elections, the appeal for Pakistan was crucial for the Muslim league's victory. According to Robert Stern, religious fervour played part in the league's victory. In Punjab also religious appeal was the factor in the battle between the league and the Muslim members of the Unionist party who were not interested in Pakistan.

Compared to above table Indian Annual Register, 1946, vol. I shows different scenario. There has been some differences between the results of the two sources.

Aftermath

The Congress formed its ministries in Assam, Bihar, Bombay, Central Provinces, Madras, NWFP, Orissa and United Provinces. The Muslim League formed its ministries in Bengal and Sind. A coalition government consisting of the Congress, Unionist Party and the Akalis was formed in Punjab Province.

Punjab Province 
A well-documented account of how the Coalition Government − under popular Punjabi Muslim, Hindu, and Sikh leaders such as Khizar Hayat Tiwana, Chhotu Ram, and Tara Singh − lead by the secular Unionist Party in Punjab Province collapsed as a result of a massive campaign launched by the then Punjab Muslim League has been given by Sharma, Madhulika. AIML (Punjab) deemed the coalition government as a 'non-representative' government and thought it was their right to bring such government down (notwithstanding the fact that it was a legal and democratically elected government). AIML (P) called for a 'Civil Disobedience' movement − fully backed by Mr. Jinnah and Mr. Liaquat Ali Khan, after they had failed to enlist Sikh's support to help form an AIML led government in Punjab. This led to bloody communal riots in Punjab during the later part of 1946. 

By early 1947, the law and order situation in the province came to such a point where civil life was utterly paralyzed. It was under such circumstances that the Premier of Punjab (Chief Minister), Khizar Hayat Tiwana of the coalition-led Unionist Party was forced to resign, on 2 March 1947. His cabinet was dissolved the same day. As there was no hope left for any other government to be formed to take the place of the Khizer government, the then Punjab Governor Sir Evan Jenkins imposed Governor's rule in Punjab on 5 March which continued up to the partition day, that is 15 August 1947.

Akali-Dall Sikhs, with 22 seats, were major stakeholders in the coalition along with Congress(51) and the Unionist Party (20), who were infuriated over the dissolution of the Khizer Government. It was in this backdrop that on 3 March 1947, Akali Sikh leader Master Tara Singh brandished his kirpan outside Punjab Assembly saying openly 'down with Pakistan and blood be to the one who demands it'. From this day onwards, Punjab was engulfed in such bloodied communal riots that history had never witnessed before. Eventually, Punjab had to be partitioned into the Indian and Pakistani Punjab. In the process, over a million innocent people were massacred, millions were forced to cross over and become refugees while thousands of women were abducted, raped and killed, across all religious communities in Punjab.

References 

Indian independence movement
Pakistan Movement
Political history of India
Political history of Pakistan
1946 elections in India
1946 in British India
Provincial Assembly elections in British India